St Helens Hospital may refer to:

United Kingdom 
St Helens Hospital, Merseyside
St Helen's Hospital, Clatterbridge Cancer Centre
St Helen's Hospital, now St Mary's Hospital, Kettering
St Helens and Knowsley Teaching Hospitals
St Helen's Isolation Hospital, Isles of Scilly
St Helen's Rehabilitation Hospital, York

Australia 
St Helen's Hospital (Brisbane), now Wesley Hospital (Brisbane)

New Zealand 
St Helens Hospitals, New Zealand